Miss Vickie's is a Canadian brand of potato chips made by Frito-Lay in the United States and Canada. The chips are kettle cooked and come in a variety of flavours. They are sold in Canada, Europe, and the United States. Originating on a farm from a recipe her mother had given to her, Miss Vickie slightly altered her inherited recipe by adding peanut oil to the potato chips.

History
The recipe originated with Vickie and Bill Kerr, at their potato farm in New Lowell, Ontario. The chips saw their debut at the 14th annual Alliston Potato Festival in 1987, gained quick popularity amongst festival attendees and completely sold out. Over the next few years the chips were produced and marketed from Pointe-Claire, Quebec, and became popular throughout all of Canada, holding 1% of the national market. 

On February 1, 1993, Miss Vickie's was purchased by Hostess Frito-Lay.

References

External links
 

Frito-Lay brands
Brand name potato chips and crisps
Canadian snack foods
Products introduced in 1987
1987 establishments in Canada